Rajampet Lok Sabha constituency is one of the twenty-five lok sabha constituencies of Andhra Pradesh in India. It comprises 6 assembly segments From Annamayya district and Vontimitta & Siddavatam mandals of Kadapa district and 1 assembly from Chittoor district .

Assembly segments
Rajampet Lok Sabha constituency presently comprises the following Legislative Assembly segments:

Members of Parliament

Election results

General Election 1989

General Election 1991

General Election 1996

General Election 1998

General Election 1999

General Election 2004

General Election 2009

General Election 2014

General Election 2019

See also
 Kadapa district
 List of Constituencies of the Lok Sabha

References

External links
 Rajampet lok sabha constituency election 2019 date and schedule

Lok Sabha constituencies in Andhra Pradesh
Kadapa district